Sree Ramkrishna Silpa Vidyapith , established in 1953,  is a government polytechnic located in Suri,  Birbhum district, West Bengal. This polytechnic is affiliated to the West Bengal State Council of Technical Education,  and recognised by AICTE, New Delhi. This polytechnic offers diploma courses in Civil, Electrical, Mechanical  and Pharmacy.

History
During the second five-year plan period, the infrastructural growth required huge number of trained and skilled manpower to take the country forward. Visionaries like Thakur Satyananda Dev, Sri Satyanarayan Chattopadhyay,
Sri Satyanarayan Bandyopadhyay, Sri Kamada kinkar Mukherjee MLC, Dr.Kaligati Bandyopadhyay felt the necessity to set up a technical institution in Birbhum and founded a technical school, so that Birbhum can contribute to its due share in national development. The journey of a technical school started humbly in a Municipal Godown in Duttapukur near Municipal Girls' School in Suri Birbhum. The technical institution was formally inaugurated on 17 November 1952 by the then Governor of West Bengal H.E. Harendra Coomar Mookerjee. During the early days, the institution offered courses only in Licentiate in Civil Engineering [LCE] and Draftsmanship, this may be a reason why, Sri Ramakrishna Silpa Vidyapith is still today fondly called and known as LC COLLEGE.
Initially classes were held at Ramkrishna Vidyapith. Due to huge popularity and rush of students, a new building and a hostel was built and the institution moved to its new building at present location in the year 1962. The institution flourished and new courses in Licentiate in Mechanical Engineering and Licentiate in Electrical Engineering were offered. Sri Ramakrishna Silpa Vidyapith Suri was taken over by the State Government in the year 1977. Today Sri Ramakrishna Silpa Vidyapith Suri is one of the oldest government polytechnics in West Bengal.

See also

References

External links
 Admission to Polytechnics in West Bengal for Academic Session 2006-2007
https://srsv.yolasite.com/
Official website WBSCTE

Engineering colleges in West Bengal
Universities and colleges in Birbhum district
1953 establishments in West Bengal
Technical universities and colleges in West Bengal